The Regina Blues were a Tier-II Junior "A" team based in Regina, Saskatchewan.  They were members of the Saskatchewan Junior Hockey League.

History
The "Pat Blues" were created in 1970 when the Regina Pats transferred from the SJHL to the Western Hockey League to maintain their Memorial Cup eligibility. The Blues were the Junior "A" affiliate team for the Major Junior parent club Regina Pats and played their home games at Regina Exhibition Stadium (1970-77) and Regina Agridome (1977-82, now called the Brandt Centre).

Season-by-season standings

Playoffs
1971 DNQ
1972 Lost Quarter-final
Melville Millionaires defeated Regina Blues 4-games-to-none
1973 Lost Quarter-final
Estevan Bruins defeated Regina Blues 4-games-to-2
1974 Lost Quarter-final
Weyburn Red Wings defeated Regina Blues 4-games-to-1
1975 Lost Quarter-final
Swift Current Broncos defeated Regina Blues 4-games-to-2
1976 Lost Quarter-final
Weyburn Red Wings defeated Regina Blues 4-games-to-1
1977 Lost Quarter-final
Weyburn Red Wings defeated Regina Blues 4-games-to-2
1978 Lost Semi-final
Regina Blues defeated Estevan Bruins 4-games-to-1
Moose Jaw Canucks defeated Regina Blues 4-games-to-1
1979 Lost Quarter-final
Moose Jaw Canucks defeated Regina Blues 4-games-to-1
1980 Lost Quarter-final
Estevan Bruins defeated Regina Blues 4-games-to-none
1981 DNQ
1982 DNQ

External links
SJHL Website

Sport in Regina, Saskatchewan
Defunct Saskatchewan Junior Hockey League teams
Defunct sports teams in Saskatchewan